San Giusto Canavese is a comune (municipality) in the Metropolitan City of Turin in the Italian region Piedmont, located about 30 km northeast of Turin.

San Giusto Canavese borders the following municipalities: San Giorgio Canavese, Feletto, Foglizzo, and Bosconero.

References

External links
 Official website

Cities and towns in Piedmont